Wayde Compton (born 1972) is a Canadian writer. He was born in Vancouver, British Columbia.

Compton has published books of poetry, essays, and fiction, and he edited the first comprehensive anthology of black writing from British Columbia. He co-founded Commodore Books with David Chariandy and Karina Vernon in 2006, the first black-oriented press in Western Canada. He also co-founded the Hogan's Alley Memorial Project in 2002, a grassroots organization that promotes the history of Vancouver's black community. Compton teaches in the faculty of Creative Writing at Douglas College.

In 1996 he penned the semi-autobiographical poem "Declaration of the Halfrican Nation".

Bibliography

Anthologies
Bluesprint: Black British Columbian Literature and Orature (2001)
The Revolving City: 51 Poems and the Stories Behind Them (with Renee Sarojini Saklikar) (2015)

Fiction
The Outer Harbour: Stories (2014)

Graphic fiction
The Blue Road: A Fable of Migration (illustrated by April dela Noche Milne) (2019)

Non-fiction
After Canaan: Essays on Race, Writing, and Region (2010)

Poetry
49th Parallel Psalm (1999)
Performance Bond (2004)

See also

Canadian literature
Canadian poetry
List of Canadian poets
List of Canadian writers

References

External links

Hogan's Alley Memorial Project blog

1972 births
20th-century Canadian male writers
20th-century Canadian poets
20th-century Canadian short story writers
21st-century Canadian male writers
21st-century Canadian poets
21st-century Canadian short story writers
Black Canadian writers
Canadian male non-fiction writers
Canadian male poets
Canadian male short story writers
Canadian non-fiction writers
Living people
Writers from British Columbia
Writers from Vancouver